Klara Yu-Kyoung Min (born c. 1976) is a South Korean-born classical pianist. She has performed in North America, Germany, Switzerland, France, Italy and South Korea in such venues as New York's Carnegie Hall, Merkin Hall, Barge Music, Gasteig Hall in Munich, Berlin Philharmonie Hall, and KBS Broadcast hall in Seoul.

Education 
Born into a musical family in Seoul, South Korea, Min started her first piano lessons despite what her composer mother said to her, when she refused to teach her. However, once she had made her choice, her mother was supportive of that decision. She received her musical education at Yewon School and Seoul Arts High School and continued her studies at the Manhattan School of Music. Min received a bachelor's degree with Solomon Mikowsky and a master's degree with Byron Janis. She has Aufbaustudium (Konzertexamen) at Lübeck Academy of Music in Germany with James Tocco.

Career 
Min made her New York recital debut in 2002 at Carnegie Hall's Weill Recital Hall in which she performed the US premiere of Unsuk Chin's Piano Études (selections). She has performed extensively throughout North America and Europe as well as in her home country of South Korea, in venues including Carnegie Hall's Weill Recital Hall, the Alice Tully Hall at the Lincoln Center in New York City, Gasteig in Munich, Berlin Philharmonie, Laeiszhalle in Hamburg, Wigmore Hall in London and KBS Broadcast Hall in Seoul. She has performed with orchestras such as the Korean Symphony Orchestra, Seoul Symphony Orchestra, sinfonie orchester berlin, Hamburger Kammerphilharmonie, Manhattan Chamber Orchestra, New York Sinfonietta, Fairbanks Symphony Orchestra and the American Chamber Orchestra.

Min established the as New York Concert Artists & Associates as "a modern-day realization of Robert Schumann’s Alliance of David (Davidsbund), an imagined spiritual fraternity of creative minds".

Min's first album, Ripples on Water, features modern Korean piano music. It was released on Naxos. Her second release of a selection of Chopin's Mazurkas was released on Delos. The American Record Guide selected the album as one of six critics' choices in 2013 raving that "her dynamic control is out of this world". 

Min was the recipient of a Samsung scholarship. She became a Steinway Artist in 2014 and is based in Berlin and New York.

Faculty 
Min has been a piano faculty member at Wesleyan University in Connecticut and an assistant teacher at Cincinnati Conservatory of Music at the University of Cincinnati.

Awards 
Min is a recipient of the Samsung scholarship. Other competition prizes include a Grand Prize at the IBLA Grand Prize International Competition, Best Performance of Mozart at the Viotti-Valsesia International Piano Competition in Italy, and a top prize at the World Piano Competition in Cincinnati.

Her performances have been praised by New York Concert Review as "a lovely, nuanced tone, genuine expressiveness, excellent technique, exuberance and vitality" and by the Polish newspaper Przegląd Polski as "a beautiful, rich sound and splendid vitality". The Cincinnati Enquirer said that "although she is petite, she has steely nerves".

Personal life 
Min resides in New York City.

References

External links
 
 Korean Cultural Services NY Meets Billboard Charting Korean Artist. August 8, 2011.

1970s births
Living people
People from Seoul
South Korean pianists
South Korean women pianists
Wesleyan University faculty
South Korean expatriates in the United States
Musicians from New York City
21st-century American women musicians
21st-century pianists
American women academics
21st-century women pianists